Jake Averillo (born 11 August 2000) is an Australian professional rugby league footballer who plays as a  for the Canterbury-Bankstown Bulldogs in the NRL.

Background
Averillo was born in Sydney, New South Wales, Australia.

Averillo is of Italian and Zimbabwean descent. 
And is eligible to represent Italy National Rugby League Team.

He is the nephew of Socceroo Jason Van Blerk and the grandson of Socceroo Cliff Van Blerk.

Averillo played his junior rugby league for Bankstown Sports and Moorebank Rams, before being recruited by the Canterbury-Bankstown Bulldogs.

Playing career

2020
Averillo made his debut in round 2 of the 2020 NRL season for Canterbury-Bankstown against North Queensland starting from the bench in front of an empty ANZ Stadium.

2021
In round 14 of the 2021 NRL season, Averillo scored two tries and kicked five goals as Canterbury defeated St. George Illawarra.  It was only Canterbury's second win for the season.

In round 22 of the 2021 NRL season, Averillo broke his hand in Canterbury's loss against the New Zealand Warriors.
In round 25, he scored two tries for Canterbury in a 38-0 victory over the hapless Wests Tigers.
Averillo made a total of 21 appearances for Canterbury in the 2021 NRL season as the club finished last and claimed the Wooden Spoon.

2022
In round 12 of the 2022 NRL season, he scored two tries for Canterbury in their 34-24 loss against St. George Illawarra at a sold out Belmore Sports Ground.
In round 14, Averillo scored two tries for Canterbury in their 34-4 upset victory over arch-rivals Parramatta.
The following week, he scored a further two tries in Canterbury's 36-12 victory over the Wests Tigers.
Averillo played a total of 20 matches for Canterbury throughout the season scoring nine tries.  The club would finish 12th on the table and miss the finals.

References

External links
Canterbury-Bankstown Bulldogs profile

2000 births
Living people
Australian rugby league players
Australian people of Zimbabwean descent
Australian people of Italian descent
Australian people of Dutch descent
Canterbury-Bankstown Bulldogs players
Rugby league centres
Rugby league players from Sydney